The Abita Springs Historic District, in Abita Springs in St. Tammany Parish, Louisiana, is a  historic district which was listed on the National Register of Historic Places in 1982.  It included 180 contributing buildings.

It is roughly bounded by North, Cypress, Laurell, Highway 36, Eighth, Sixth, Seventh, St. Mary and Third Streets and the Abita River.

It includes Colonial Revival, Stick/eastlake, Queen Anne architecture.

The town was developed as a vacation refuge for middle class residents of New Orleans.  Most residences are in walking distance to the Abita River and the springs which were the original attraction of the town, churches, the commercial district and train depot.

It includes a large number of turn-of-the-20th-century shotguns and North Shore type houses, many with Eastlake or Colonial Revival-style porches.  There are some more substantial Queen Anne and Colonial Revival buildings, which are "few in number and are in no way extravagant", and which feature porches as well.

See also
Abita Springs Pavilion

References

Historic districts on the National Register of Historic Places in Louisiana
Queen Anne architecture in Louisiana
Colonial Revival architecture in Louisiana
St. Tammany Parish, Louisiana